The Maine Black Bears women’s ice hockey team represents the University of Maine. The team plays their home games in Alfond Arena. The team's first year of play was in 1997–98. The Black Bears finished 6th in the 2019-2020 season, advancing to the semi-finals of the Hockey East tournament, before losing to the eventual champions Northeastern Huskies by a score of 1-3. The 2020 Hockey East women's ice hockey tournament was cancelled due to the Coronavirus outbreak, but Maine would not have qualified even if the tournament had been played. Hockey East announced plans in July 2020 to play the 2020-2021 hockey season, with an emphasis on league play.

Coaches
The current head coach is Richard Reichenbach. In the 2019-20 season, his fifth season as head coach, he led Maine to a record of 15-14-8. Prior to coaching at the University of Maine, Reichenbach was an assistant with Cortland State. Reichenbach is a 2006 graduate of Hamilton College, where he was a hockey and lacrosse standout. He was team captain in his senior year. He played one year of professional hockey, on the Richmond Renegades of the SPHL.

Maria Lewis was head coach for the Bears for four seasons, and earned the Hockey East Coach of the Year award in 2012. That season, the Bears finished fourth in the Hockey East conference, with an overall record of 17-11-6. Prior to taking on the head coach responsibilities at Maine, Lewis was an assistant coach for Mercyhurst Lakers women's ice hockey team, where she twice won the College Hockey Assistant Coach of the year award. She was also an assistant coach with the Ohio State Buckeyes and the University of North Dakota Fighting Hawks.

Dan Lichterman became the third head coach for the Black Bears for the 2007-2008 season and coached for three seasons. He left at the end of his first contract, citing the need to support his wife's career.

Lauren Steblen, associate coach under Guy Perron, stepped in as interim coach in the 2006-2007 season. Steblen played defense for the Bears as a college player, and in her senior season, 2000-2001, the team made the Hockey East tournament for the first time. After graduating from Maine, she coached the Bemidji State Beavers, in Minnesota. At the end of her year as interim head coach, she decided not to pursue the permanent post.

Guy Perron was hired as the second head coach for the Black Bears. A graduate of UM, Perron was a two-time captain for the Black Bears, and tallied a career total of 62 gold and 84 assists for 146 points in 136 games.  Perron coached the Black Bears to a 17-9-6 season in his second year. He left the following season to be the associate head coach and recruiting director for Maine's men's ice hockey program. He later became a scout for the Colorado Avalanche in the NHL.

Rick Filighera was the inaugural head coach for the Maine Black Bears' program, and oversaw the program for its first seven seasons. He came to Maine from a head coaching position with the Rochester Institute of Technology's women's hockey team. In 2003-2004, he was the runner up for the Hockey East Coach of the Year award.  After leaving Maine in 1997, he became the head coach for Gilmour Academy in Gates Mills, Ohio. As of 2020-2021, he was the head coach for the Cortland Red Dragons, in the Northeast Women's Hockey League.

Year by year

Sources

Team Scoring Champions

Team captains
In progress
1997-98: Alana Ahearn
1998-99: Alison Lorenz, Christina Hedges
1999-00: Kelly Nelson
2000-01: Kelly Nelson
2001-02: Amanda Cronin, Jarin Sjorgen
2002-03: Jarin Sjorgen
2003-04: Lara Smart
2004-05: Tristian Desmet, Emily Stevens
2005-06: Cheryl White, Morgan Janusc
2006-07: Kelly Law, Sonia Corriveau
2007-08: Jenna Cowan
2008-09: Vanessa Vani
2009-10: Amy Stech
2010-11: Dawn Sullivan
2011-12: Dawn Sullivan
2012-13: Kylie Smith, Chloe Tinkler
2013-14: Jennifer More, Brittney Huneke
2014-15: Jennifer More (C), Brittney Huneke, Katy Massey (A)
2015-16: Abby Cooke, Emilie Brigham (C), Brooklyn Langlois, Eve Boissoneault (A)
2016-17: Emilie Brigham, Jess Vallotton
2017-18: Alyson Matteau (C), Brooke Stacey, Cailey Hutchinson (A)
2018-19: Jillian Flynn
2019-20: Jillian Flynn
2020-21: Taylor Leech
2021-22: Taylor Leech

Current roster

2022–23 Black Bears
As of September 26, 2022.

Black Bears in Pro Hockey

Olympians

Awards and honors

Hockey East
 Brittany Ott, 2010 WHEA All-Rookie Team
 Amy Stech, Runner up, 2010 Hockey East Sportsmanship Award
Meghann Treacy, 2014-15 Hockey East First Team All-Star

Hockey East weekly honors
 Jenna Ouellette – Maine, WHEA Player of the Month, December 2009
Meghann Treacy, Hockey East Defensive Player of the Month (October 2014) 
Meghann Treacy, Hockey East Defensive Player of the Month (November 2014)

Hockey East weekly honors
 Carly Jackson, Pro-Ambitions Rookie of the Week (awarded October 17, 2016)
 Michelle Weis, Pro-Ambitions Rookie of the Week (awarded October 2, 2017

HCA Awards
Ida Kuoppala, Women's Hockey Commissioners Association Rookie of the Month February 2020

References

 
Ice hockey teams in Maine